Alexandra Borchio-Fontimp (born 5 October 1981) is a French journalist and politician.

A member of Les Républicains, she has been a senator for the Alpes-Maritimes since 2020.

She has also been a departmental councilor for the Alpes-Maritimes since 2015, elected in the canton of Antibes-2 with Jacques Gente.

Since 2019, she has also been a Deputy Assistant Secretary General of Les Républicains.

In July 2022, she publicly called for laws to be introduced to extend legal protection to traditional French recipes, such as salade niçoise, to prevent restaurants or food manufacturers from altering their recipes.

In September 2022, she coauthored a French Senate committee report condemning sexual abuse in the French pornography industry.

References 

1981 births
21st-century French women politicians
French Senators of the Fifth Republic
French women journalists
Living people
People from Antibes
Senators of Alpes-Maritimes
The Republicans (France) politicians
Women members of the Senate (France)